Namsan Senior High School was an elite school in Pyongyang, North Korea.

Curriculum  

Kim Il-sung required that Russian be taught at the school.

Alumni 

 Kim Jong-il (graduated in 1960)
 Ri Yong-ho (graduated in 1973)

References

Education in Pyongyang
Schools in North Korea